Kurow is a small town in the Waitaki District, New Zealand.

Description
The name is an Anglicised form of the Māori name of the nearby mountain, Te Kohurau.

In the 1920s, the town was the base for the building of the nearby Waitaki Dam and forming Lake Waitaki in the first of a series of hydroelectric projects on the Waitaki River.

The first social security scheme for New Zealand workers was designed in the town, arising from Presbyterian Minister of Kurow Arnold Nordmeyer's experience of working with families of workers on the Waitaki hydro-electric project.

Examples of pre-European Māori cave paintings are close to the small settlement of Duntroon.

The land around the town includes summerfruit orchards, and increasing amounts of Pinot noir are being planted in the limestone soils. In 2021, there were 13 wineries and vineyards in operation in the Waitaki valley.

The town was the terminus of the Kurow Branch railway, opened in 1881 to Hakataramea, across the Waitaki River, but cut back to Kurow in 1930. It closed in 1983: the line can be traced on the ground, and the station still building stands on Liverpool St. From 1928 until 1937, a line owned by the Public Works Department ran from Kurow to the hydroelectric project 6.4 km to the west.

Investigations into two proposals for further hydroelectricity development on the lower Waitaki river: Project Aqua and North Bank Tunnel benefited the economy of Kurow. Neither of these got past the planning stage and caused significant social disruption to the community.

Kurow had been trying to fund a statue of Richie McCaw since 2016 but has struggled to raise the required money. A seven metre tall statue was being considered at one stage.

Demographics
It is part of the larger Danseys Pass statistical area.

Kurow had a population of 372 at the 2018 New Zealand census, an increase of 51 people (15.9%) since the 2013 census, and an increase of 24 people (6.9%) since the 2006 census. There were 165 households. There were 192 males and 180 females, giving a sex ratio of 1.07 males per female, with 54 people (14.5%) aged under 15 years, 30 (8.1%) aged 15 to 29, 144 (38.7%) aged 30 to 64, and 147 (39.5%) aged 65 or older.

Ethnicities were 91.9% European/Pākehā, 12.9% Māori, 0.0% Pacific peoples, 4.0% Asian, and 1.6% other ethnicities (totals add to more than 100% since people could identify with multiple ethnicities).

Although some people objected to giving their religion, 36.3% had no religion, 50.0% were Christian, 0.8% were Muslim and 2.4% had other religions.

Of those at least 15 years old, 27 (8.5%) people had a bachelor or higher degree, and 108 (34.0%) people had no formal qualifications. The employment status of those at least 15 was that 126 (39.6%) people were employed full-time, 51 (16.0%) were part-time, and 6 (1.9%) were unemployed.

Danseys Pass statistical area

Danseys Pass had a population of 987 at the 2018 New Zealand census, an increase of 72 people (7.9%) since the 2013 census, and an increase of 123 people (14.2%) since the 2006 census. There were 399 households. There were 504 males and 483 females, giving a sex ratio of 1.04 males per female. The median age was 45.4 years (compared with 37.4 years nationally), with 189 people (19.1%) aged under 15 years, 141 (14.3%) aged 15 to 29, 438 (44.4%) aged 30 to 64, and 219 (22.2%) aged 65 or older.

Ethnicities were 88.1% European/Pākehā, 9.7% Māori, 8.2% Asian, and 1.5% other ethnicities (totals add to more than 100% since people could identify with multiple ethnicities).

The proportion of people born overseas was 16.1%, compared with 27.1% nationally.

Although some people objected to giving their religion, 43.5% had no religion, 42.2% were Christian, 1.2% were Hindu, 0.3% were Muslim, 1.2% were Buddhist and 3.3% had other religions.

Of those at least 15 years old, 90 (11.3%) people had a bachelor or higher degree, and 213 (26.7%) people had no formal qualifications. The median income was $29,500, compared with $31,800 nationally. 90 people (11.3%) earned over $70,000 compared to 17.2% nationally. The employment status of those at least 15 was that 399 (50.0%) people were employed full-time, 132 (16.5%) were part-time, and 12 (1.5%) were unemployed.

Kurow hotel 

The original Kurow hotel dates from the 1860s and had some 24 rooms, a billiard room and stables for horses. Damaged by a fire it was rebuilt in 1892. Again damaged by another fire in 1905, the Kurow hotel was rebuilt out of Oamaru stone. The brightly coloured building is a category two historic place.

Kurow museum 

The Kurow museum is located at 57 Bledisloe Street. It showcases early settlers in the area and the development of the social security scheme to help families in need.

Awakino ski area 
Kurow is the closest town to the Awakino ski area which is 15 kilometres away.

Education
Waitaki Valley School is a full primary school catering for years 1 to 8, with a roll of  students as of  The school was created from the merger in 2004 of Kurow Area, Otematata, Cattle Creek, and Hakataramea schools. It moved to its present site in 2012.

Notable people 
Notable people with connections to Kurow include:
Steve Hotton, Otago rugby player 
Roy Kerr, Mathematician 
Richie McCaw, All Black captain 
Dr Gervan McMillan and his wife Ethel were residents of Kurow from 1929 to 1934, with Dr McMillan running a medical practice there.
Arnold Nordmeyer, minister of finance and Labour Party politician
Charles Saxton. All Black and rugby administrator

References

Waitaki District
Populated places in Canterbury, New Zealand
Wine regions of New Zealand